Pertuisane was the name ship of her class of four destroyers built for the French Navy around the beginning of the 20th century.

References 

 

Pertuisane-class destroyers
Ships built in France
1900 ships